was a Japanese homoerotic fetish artist. Hirano, along with Go Mishima, Sanshi Funayama, and Tatsuji Okawa, is regarded by artist and historian Gengoroh Tagame as a central figure in the first wave of contemporary gay artists in Japan.

Biography
Very little information is known about Hirano, as his works were submitted to his editors anonymously. His illustrations are noted for their realist art style, and often featured masculine men with body hair.

His art appeared in Barazoku, the first commercially circulated gay magazine in Japan, from the 1970s through the 1990s.

See also
 Homosexuality in Japan

References

20th-century Japanese painters
Fetish artists
Japanese gay artists
Gay male BDSM
Japanese erotic artists
Year of birth unknown
Year of death unknown